David F. Nazworthy, professionally known as Dave Naz (born September 2, 1969) is an American photographer and film director.

Early life 
Nazworthy was born in Los Angeles, California, and grew up in Beverly Hills. He is the son of Maxine F. Nazworthy, descendant of Max Factor, Sr., founder of the Max Factor company. Nazworthy attended El Rodeo Elementary School in Beverly Hills, California, and earned his high school diploma from Beverly Hills High School.

Career
From 1985 up to 1997, Nazworthy played in the punk rock bands Chemical People, Down by Law, and The Last.

Inspired by artists such as Larry Clark, Nan Goldin and Diane Arbus, Naz started photographing people in sexual situations. In 2001, Naz assisted photographer Richard Kern and went on to shoot for a number of adult magazines, including Hustler, Taboo, Leg Show and Barely Legal. Several of Nazworthy's photos are used in the artwork of American painter and photographer Richard Prince.

Bibliography
 (2022) Legs. Nylons. Nudes -  Edition Reuss 
 (2021) Dressed Undressed -  Edition Reuss 
 (2019) Naked Girls with Small Breasts -  Edition Reuss 
 (2018) Natural -  Issue, Inc. 
 (2017) Identity: In & Beyond The Binary -  Rare Bird Books, A Barnacle Book. 
 (2014) Genderqueer: And Other Gender Identities - (Essays by Morty Diamond, Jiz Lee, Sarah B. Burghauser, Ignacio Rivera, Jenny Factor). Rare Bird Books, A Barnacle Book. 
 (2011) Butt Babes - (Foreword by Lydia Lunch). Goliath Press. 
 (2010) A.S.L. - Edition Reuss 
 (2007) L.A. Bondage - (Foreword by Eric Kroll). Goliath Press. 
 (2006) Fresh: Girls Of Seduction - (Foreword by Mat Gleason). Goliath Press. 
 (2004) Legs - (Foreword by Nina Hartley). Goliath Press. 
 (2003) Panties - (Foreword by Lydia Lunch). Goliath Press. 
 (2002) Lust Circus - (Foreword by Tony Mitchell). Goliath Press.

Exhibitions
 (2015) Identity - University of Redlands Art Gallery (Redlands, CA)
 (2014) Identity - Coagula Curatorial (Los Angeles, CA)
 (2009) Candids - Perihelion Arts Gallery (Phoenix, AZ)
 (2007) Candids - Todd/Browning Gallery (Los Angeles, CA)
 (2005) Legs - Clair Obscur Gallery (Los Angeles, CA) 
 (2004) Legs - Sometimes Madness is Wisdom Gallery (Los Angeles, CA)
 (2003) Panties - Perihelion Arts Gallery (Phoenix, AZ)
 (2002) Lust Circus - Stormy Leather Gallery (San Francisco, CA)
 (2002) Lust Circus - Curated by Mat Gleason, Coagula Gallery (Los Angeles, CA)

Partial filmography
 (2015) "Identity: In & Beyond The Binary"
 (2012) "Waking Up"
 (2011)  Slave 06 (JM Productions)
 (2010)  F. M. Indie (Private Media Group)
 (2010)  Turbo Rock (Good Releasing)
 (2009)  Cheating Hollywood Wives  (Private Media Group)
 (2009)  L.A. Girls Love...  (Private Media Group)
 (2008)  Sugar Town (Vivid-Alt)
 (2008)  Circa '82 (Vivid-Alt)
 (2008)  House of Sex & Domination  (Private Media Group)
 (2008)  L.A. Lust  (Private Media Group)
 (2006)  Skater Girl Fever (Vivid-Alt)

Awards
 2009 AVN Award Winner – Best Best BDSM Release (House of Sex & Domination - Private Media Group)
 2009 Ninfa Award Winner for Best BDSM Film (House of Sex & Domination - Private Media Group)

References

External links

 
 
 Discogs
 Dave Naz, Online Gallery on Erographic
 "4 Porn Stars Talk About How They Fell in Love"

Interviews
 Eros Interview
 Gram Ponante Interview

Alt porn
Fetish photographers
1969 births
Living people
American erotic photographers
American people of Polish-Jewish descent